Bulbul Can Sing is a 2018 Indian Assamese language drama film directed by Rima Das. It was screened in the Contemporary World Cinema section at the 2018 Toronto International Film Festival. The film centres on three teenagers trying to come to terms with their sexual identities. The film won the National Film Award for Best Feature Film in Assamese at India's 66th National Film Awards.

Plot
Bulbul is a young girl who lives in Kalardiya village near Chaygaon in India's Assam state. She has two best friends, Bonny and Sumu, and they are coming of age and finding their own identities but who they want to be and what their community expect them to be are two different things as they find themselves at odds with the social mores and moral codes of their village. Clashes emerge as Bulbul finds herself experiencing the first glimmers of attraction for a guy, Sumu is bullied for not acting like a traditional man and Bonny finds the pressures of the community become unbearable. As fear and doubt assail the three friends, Bulbul must find her own voice and sing.

Cast
 Arnali Das as Bulbul
 Banita Thakuriya as Bonnie
 Manoranjan Das as Suman
 Manabendra Das
 Pakija Begam

Reception

Critical response
Bulbul Can Sing mostly received positive reviews from critics. Deborah Young of The Hollywood Reporter called the film "quietly insightful" which "has a pleasing simplicity and realism", while Wendy Ide of Screen described it as "a heartfelt, acutely honest portrait of rural Indian adolescence."

Among Indian critics, Anirudh Bhattacharyya of Outlook felt that with this film director Das had surpassed the expectations raised from her previous directorial Village Rockstars. According to Sonal Pandya of Cinestaan, Das has matured as a filmmaker with this film and the film's beginning and end were bookended nicely. Aswathy Gopalakrishnan also praised the film for its subtle take on feminism and patriarchy.

Accolades

References

External links
 

2018 films
2018 drama films
2018 LGBT-related films
2010s Assamese-language films
Indian drama films
Indian LGBT-related films
LGBT-related drama films
Best Assamese Feature Film National Film Award winners